Ardozyga enchotypa is a species of moth in the family Gelechiidae. It was described by Turner in 1919. It is found in Australia, where it has been recorded from Victoria.

The forewings are fuscous more or less irrorated (sprinkled) with whitish and with a rather broad whitish streak above the middle from the base narrowing to a point at the apex, edged above and beneath by blackish lines, somewhat incomplete and interrupted, and cutting into a streak before the apex, the streak also contains a short blackish longitudinal line near the base and there is a fine blackish line on the fold. The hindwings are pale-grey, darker towards the apex.

References

Ardozyga
Moths described in 1919
Moths of Australia